Mislina Gözükara (born 20 December 1997) is a Turkish-born Azerbaijani footballer, who plays as a forward for the Turkish First League club Nuh Spor and the Azerbaijan women's national team.

Club career 
Gözükara obtained her license on 23 October 2012 from Maraşgücüspor, the first women's football club established in her hometown by a female football coach couple of months before and started in the 2012–13 league season. She played from their first season on five seasons in the Second League and Third league scoring 102 goals in 66 matches. She scored her 100th goal in the 60th match  on 4 December 2016. She served as captain of her team. In the 2017–18 season, she transferred to the Gaziantep-based ALG Spor playing in the Second League. At the end of the season, she enjoyed her team's promotion to the First League.

Early August 2020, Gözükara transferred to the Istanbul-based club Fatih Vatan Spor. In September 2020, she underwent a surgery due to rupture of the cruciate ligament she suffered during a training.

For the 2021-22 Turkcell Women's Super League season, Gözükara transferred to the newly formed team >Çaykur Rizespor. In the first half of the 2022-23 Turkish Super League season, she played for Konak Belediyespor in İzmir. She then moved to the Diyarbakır-based Turkish First League-club Nuh Spor.

International career 
Gözükara was called up to the Turkey women's U-19 team in January 2015.

In 2020, Gözükara was admitted to the Azerbaijan women's national team. She debuted in the UEFA Women's Euro 2021 qualifying Group D match against Poland on 11 March 2020.

Career statistics

Honours 
 Turkish Women's First League
 ALG Spor
 Runners-up (1): 2018–19

 Fatih Vatan Spor
 Runners-up (1): 2020–21

 Turkish Women's Second League
 Maraşgücüspor
 Winners (1): 2017–18

 Turkish Women's Third League
 Maraşgücüspor
 Winners (1): 2015–16

See also 
List of Azerbaijan women's international footballers

References

External links

1997 births
Living people
Sportspeople from Kahramanmaraş
Citizens of Azerbaijan through descent
Azerbaijani women's footballers
Women's association football forwards
Azerbaijan women's international footballers
Turkish people of Azerbaijani descent
Azerbaijani people of Turkish descent
Sportspeople of Azerbaijani descent
Turkish women's footballers
ALG Spor players
[[Category:Fatih Vatan Spor players
Turkish Women's Football Super League players
Çaykur Rizespor (women's football) players
Konak Belediyespor players